Crystal Lake, Florida may refer to:

Lakes
 Crystal Lake (Broward County, Florida), in Deerfield Beach
 Crystal Lake (Hardee County, Florida), a manmade lake in Crystal Lake Village
 Crystal Lake (Davenport, Florida), one of seven Crystal Lakes in Polk County, Florida
 Crystal Lake (Lakeland, Florida), one of seven Crystal Lakes in Polk County, Florida
 Crystal Lake (south Winter Haven, Florida), one of seven Crystal Lakes in Polk County, Florida

Settlements
 Crystal Lake, Polk County, Florida, a census-designated place
 Crystal Lake, Washington County, Florida, an unincorporated community